SS Edward M. House was a Liberty ship built in the United States during World War II. She was named after Edward M. House, an American diplomat, and an adviser to President Woodrow Wilson.

Construction
Edward M. House was laid down on 21 August 1943, under a Maritime Commission (MARCOM) contract, MC hull 1209, by the St. Johns River Shipbuilding Company, Jacksonville, Florida; she was sponsored by Miss Irene F. Long, the confidential assistant to Rear Admiral Howard L. Vickery, and was launched on 23 October 1943.

History
She was allocated to A. L. Burbank & Company, Ltd, on 4 November 1943. She took part in the invasion of Normandy, June 1944. On 30 June 1944, Edward M. House was torpedoed or mined in the English Channel. On 20 February 1946, she was allocated to the Japanese government until 16 December 1946, when she was laid up in the National Defense Reserve Fleet, Astoria, Oregon. She was sold for commercial use, 7 July 1947, to Rederi A/S Vindeggen. She was removed from the fleet on 15 July 1947. Edward M. House was renamed Blue Master and reflagged in Norway. In 1954, she was sold to Bahia Salinas Cia Nav, and reflagged in Liberia. In 1967, she was reflagged in Greece, and sold for scrapping in 1970.

References

Bibliography

 
 
 
 

 

Liberty ships
Ships built in Jacksonville, Florida
1943 ships
Astoria Reserve Fleet